Reggae Greats is a best of album by reggae artist Burning Spear.  The album is subtitled "Best of the Island Years 1975-1978" and was released in 1984.

Track listing
Door Peep
Slavery Days
Lion
Black Disciples
Man In The Hills
Tradition
Throw Down Your Arms
Social Living
Marcus Garvey
Dry & Heavy
Black WA-DA-DA (Invasion)
The Sun

1984 greatest hits albums
Burning Spear compilation albums
Island Records compilation albums